BOSS: Baap of Special Services is a 2019 Hindi action, drama, mystery, romance, and thriller web series. The series marks the Web debut of actor Karan Singh Grover and Sagarika Ghatge. The series was created by Filmy Paltan and developed by Ekta Kapoor. It is written by Ghalib Asad Bhopali and was directed by Ankush Bhatt. It was produced by Filmy Paltan and ALTBalaji, which is led by Ankush Bhatt, Ashish Kapoor and Ankur Ghai. The series also stars Ayaz Khan, Dalljiet Kaur, Gaurav Gera, Kanika Maheshwari, Sonali Raut, Karol Zine, Anveshi Jain, and Tarun Mahilani in key roles. It was made available for streaming on ALTBalaji and its associated platform on 2 August 2019.

Premise 
The series is based in Shimla's where an con-man inspector/detective Sudhir Kohli aka Keshav Khatri (played by Karan Singh Grover) who changes his identity to joins Shimla's Task Force to lead the team with ACP Sakshi Ranjan (played by Sagarika Ghatge) in solving criminal cases which make him the Boss - BAAP of Special Services because of his peculiar style.

Synopsis 
In Shimla, the crime rate suddenly rises beyond unexpected and the local doesn't co-operate with the Police. The Police Chief of Shimla appoints a special task force a team of five officers to control the crimes in the city. A specialist Officer was joined in the team from Delhi. A con-man changes his identity and join the special task force to find out his kidnapped daughter and the identity of balloon man.

Cast

Main
Karan Singh Grover as Sudhir Kohli/Keshav Khatri
Sagarika Ghatge as ACP Sakshi Ranjan

Recurring
Asma Siddhique as Pooja 
 Anveshi Jain as Megha 
Ayaz Khan as Inspector Asif Malik
Gaurav Gera as Jignesh, Keshav's friend
Veer Aryan as Inspector Sudhir Kohli 
Tarun Mahilani as Inspector Janardhan 'Jonny' Bisht 
Kevina Tak as Pari, Keshav's daughter
Jignesh Joshi as Inspector Pandey
Opal Mehta as Shreya (chief's daughter)
Ashok Kumar Mehta as Mahitosh Negi
Ashmita as Suhasini Iyer, Head of Police Cyber Cell
Mahesh Shetty as Rawat, Police Chief 
Dalljiet Kaur as Devki, Chief's Wife 
Pankaj Kalra as Gajendra Thakur 
Niyati Joshi as Lovely 
Gopi Singh as Jogi / Bhurelal 
Sudhir Rathi as Chaudhry 
Kanika Maheshwari as Safia 
Mazher Sayyad as Zakir 
Sunit Razdan as Lohiya 
Arti Gupra as Pratyusha 
Rishabh Jolly as Qureshi 
Karol Zine as Komal 
Rohit Gujjar as Aman Verma 
Vijay Kumar as Harishankar 
Amandeep Sohi as Devyani 
Anisa Butt as Tanya 
Atul Mathur as Safdar 
Rashika Pradhan as Avantika 
Naina Bahl as Ankita 
Darpan Srivastava as Veedhnath 
Nimesh Soni as Lallan 
Ruchit Tahiliani as Kitty 
Ankita Sahu as Shamita 
Khatija Iqbal as Tina 
Micckie Dudaney as Arjun
Vinod Sharma as Mr.Mithani
Mishal Raheja as Vicky Malhotra 
Ashmita Kaur Bakshi as Suhasini
Simran Mishrikoti

Episodes

Soundtrack 

Track list

Production

Development 
The web series was announced in the first week of March 2019 to be directed by Ankush Bhatt, starring Karan Singh Grover and Sagarika Ghatge.

The web series marks the fourth collaboration between Ekta Kapoor and Karan Singh Grover after Kitni Mast Hai Zindagi (2004) Kasautii Zindagii Kay (2005) and Kasautii Zindagii Kay (2019). It also marks the third collaboration between Ankush Bhatt and Grover after 3 Dev and Firrkie, which both not released It also marks the second collaboration between Grover and Ayaz Khan after Dill Mill Gayye (2007).

Filming 
Principal photography commenced in Shimla with the lead actors Grover and Ghatge, and they had been spotted shooting on Monday 18 March 2019.

Director Ankush Bhatt announced the wrap up of the first schedule of "BOSS: Baap of Special Services" in Shimla using his Instagram post on 23 March 2019.

Marketing and release

Release 
BOSS: Baap of Special Services was scheduled for streaming on ALTBalaji app from 2 August 2019.

Reception 
Deeksha Vipat of India Forums gave the series a rating of 4 stars saying that, "Boss: Baap of Special Services is perfect for your weekend binge-watch session. If you’re a member of Karan Singh Grover fan club, DO NOT MISS this one. If it was a movie, it would have received whistles and claps for the sheer cinematic joy and entertaining shots".

Arushi Jain of The Indian Express stated that "Boss – Baap of Special Services streaming on AltBalaji is a full-on masala entertainer. Karan Singh Grover's comic timing and suspense behind him turning into a conman make it an easy binge.“

Neeki Singh of Spotboye.com stated that "BOSS: Baap of Special Services Review: Karan Singh Grover-Sagarika Ghatge's Web Series Is Gripping And Worth The Binge!"

Ruchita Mishra of Peeping Moon stated that "Karan Singh Grover and Sagarika Ghatge’s crackling chemistry makes the action-packed thriller a must-watch!"

Ruchi Kaushal of Hindustan Times stated that "BOSS Baap of Special Services review: Karan Singh Grover’s web show has its merits but the sex will make you cringe"

See also 
 ALTBalaji original programming

References

External links 
 
 Boss: Baap of Special Services on ALT Balaji

2019 web series debuts
Indian drama web series
ALTBalaji original programming